Tutuka Power Station in Mpumalanga, South Africa, is a coal-fired power plant operated by Eskom. It is a twin sister to Duvha Power Station.

History
The first unit at Tutuka was commissioned in June 1985 and the last went online in June 1990.

Power generation
The station has six 609MW units with a total installed capacity of 3,654MW with turbine Maximum Continuous Rating at 38.00%. Tutuka is an important link in the 765kV extra-high-voltage transmission system linking Mpumalanga with the Western Cape and KwaZulu-Natal.

Crime and corruption
In November 2021 two persons employed by the station and a supplier of goods and services were arrested. They were charged with theft, fraud and corruption in connection with the disappearance of spares. It was further alleged that four persons operated an oil crime syndicate which had been stealing large amounts of fuel from the station, valued at hundreds of millions of rand. Mid-December 2022, at the request of the Minister of Public Enterprises, Pravin Gordhan, and President Cyril Ramaphosa, Minister of Defence Thandi Modise deployed a small contingent of SANDF troops at the station (besides at Camden, Majuba and Grootvlei) to curb a growing threat of sabotage, theft, vandalism and corruption.

See also 

 Eskom
 Fossil-fuel power plant
 List of power stations in South Africa

References

External links
 Tutuka Power Station on the Eskom-Website

Energy infrastructure completed in 1985
Energy infrastructure completed in 1990
Coal-fired power stations in South Africa
Buildings and structures in Mpumalanga
Economy of Mpumalanga
20th-century architecture in South Africa